The 2015 McDonald's Burnie International was a professional tennis tournament played on outdoor hard courts. It was the thirteenth (for men) and seventh (for women) edition of the tournament which is part of the 2015 ATP Challenger Tour and the 2015 ITF Women's Circuit, offering a total of $50,000 in prize money for both genders. It took place in Burnie, Tasmania, Australia, on 2–8 February 2015.

Men's singles entrants

Seeds 

 1 Rankings as of 12 January 2015

Other entrants 
The following players received wildcards into the singles main draw:
  Harry Bourchier
  Maverick Banes
  Omar Jasika
  Mitchell Krueger

The following player received entry with a protected ranking:
  Tennys Sandgren

The following players received entry from the qualifying draw:
  Stefanos Tsitsipas
  Finn Tearney
  Christopher O'Connell
  Andrew Whittington

The following player received entry as a lucky loser:
  Matthew Barton

Women's singles entrants

Seeds 

 1 Rankings as of 19 January 2015

Other entrants 
The following players received wildcards into the singles main draw:
  Destanee Aiava
  Seone Mendez
  Tammi Patterson
  Storm Sanders

The following players received entry from the qualifying draw:
  Alison Bai
  Alexa Glatch
  Viktorija Rajicic
  Xu Shilin

The following player received entry by a junior exempt:
  Jil Teichmann

Champions

Men's singles 

  Chung Hyeon def.  Alex Bolt, 6–2, 7–5

Women's singles 

  Daria Gavrilova def.  Irina Falconi, 7–5, 7–5

Men's doubles 

  Carsten Ball /  Matt Reid def.  Radu Albot /  Matthew Ebden, 7–5, 6–4

Women's doubles 

  Irina Falconi /  Petra Martić def.  Han Xinyun /  Junri Namigata, 6–2, 6–4

External links 
 2015 McDonald's Burnie International at ITFtennis.com
 Official website

2015 ITF Women's Circuit
2015 ATP Challenger Tour
2015 in Australian tennis
2015